T.I. & Tiny: The Family Hustle is an American reality television series that aired on VH1 and premiered on December 5, 2011. The series concluded on May 29, 2017.

Premise
The series chronicles the life of hip-hop artist T.I., his wife Tameka "Tiny" Cottle-Harris, and their six children. The first season follows the family after T.I.'s 12-month prison sentence. The third season encompasses T.I. as he promotes his album, Trouble Man: Heavy is the Head and his role in Identity Thief. Tiny is spending her time managing her girl group OMG Girlz, starting another girl group, and holding down the family home. The fourth season picks up after T.I. completed his America's Most Wanted Tour and acting on House of Lies. He returned to the family home in Atlanta. Tiny is working on achieving her G.E.D. and making sure OMG Girlz stays constant. The couple's oldest daughter, Niq Niq, is graduating from high school. Domani is working with Russell Simmons, Messiah continues to learn about fashion, and Deyjah gets a boyfriend.

Episodes

References

External links
 
 

2010s American black television series
2010s American reality television series
2011 American television series debuts
2017 American television series endings
African-American reality television series
Television series by 51 Minds Entertainment
Television series by Endemol
Television shows filmed in Atlanta
Television series about families
Television series based on singers and musicians
English-language television shows
VH1 original programming
T.I.